The International Sea Cadet Association, referred to as "the ISCA", is a voluntary association of independent Sea Cadet Corps or corresponding organizations, committed to common concepts and goals, and wishing to share ideas and information, and, to the best of their ability, to engage in cadet exchanges and to provide mutual support in order to promote the benefits of Sea Cadet training worldwide.

Role
The ISCA promotes international co-operation and exchanges between national Sea Cadet Corps and the organisations that support them.

Constituent Sea Cadet Corps and organisations
Australian Navy Cadets
Bermuda Sea Cadet Corps
Deutsche Marine-Jugend e.V.  (Sea Cadet Corps of Germany)
Hong Kong Sea Cadets Corps
Junior Sea Friends' Federation of Japan
Sea Cadet Corps of Portugal
Royal Belgian Sea Cadet Corps
Sea Cadet Association of New Zealand
Sea Cadet Corps of India
Sea Cadet Corps of the United Kingdom
Sea Explorers of Korea
Singapore National Cadet Corps (Sea)
Swedish Sea Cadet Corps
South African Sea Cadet Corps
The Navy League of Canada
United States Naval Sea Cadet Corps
Young Mariners League of Russia
Zeekadetkorps Nederland  (Sea Cadet Corps of the Netherlands)
Zimbabwe Sea Cadet Corps

See also
Sea Cadets (national Sea Cadet organisations)

Notes

Naval Cadet organisations